Nohara (written:  is a Japanese surname. Notable people with the surname include:

, Japanese traveler
, Japanese shogi player

Japanese-language surnames